Durham—York was a provincial electoral district in northern Durham Region and York Region in Ontario, Canada that elected members to the Legislative Assembly of Ontario. It contained the towns of East Gwillimbury, Newmarket, Whitchurch–Stouffville, Uxbridge, Georgina and Brock.

The riding was created in 1977 from parts of Durham North and Ontario South, and existed until 1999 when it was distributed into York North, Pickering—Ajax—Uxbridge and Haliburton—Kawartha Lakes—Brock.

MPPs 
 Bill Newman, Progressive Conservative (1977–1981)
 Kenneth Ross Stevenson, Progressive Conservative (1981–1987)
 Bill Ballinger, Liberal (1987–1990)
 Larry O'Connor, New Democratic (1990–1995)
 Julia Munro, Progressive Conservative (1995–1999)

External links
 Legislative Assembly of Ontario: Past & Present MPPs

Former provincial electoral districts of Ontario
Georgina, Ontario
Newmarket, Ontario
Whitchurch-Stouffville